Dairena Ní Chinnéide is an Irish poet and former broadcast journalist, interpreter, television producer and mother. She has published 12 books of mainly bilingual poetry in her native Irish language and one in  English whose title is 'deleted' published by Salmon Poetry.  One of her well known poems is Jeaic ar Scoil. She has received numerous awards for her writing, including The Patrick and Katherine Kavanagh Fellowship, The Arts Council of Ireland and Éalaíon na Gaeltachta Literature Awards and was nominated Poet Laureate for Listowel during the Poetry Ireland initiative, Poetrytown 2021.

Biography
Ní Chinnéide hails from the Dingle Peninsula, County Kerry. She graduated from Dublin City University in 1989 with an honours degree in Communications studies. After working at Radio Kerry, she joined Century Radio. She was the final voice heard on Century Radio before it closed in November 1991. She moved back to Kerry to work at RTÉ Raidió na Gaeltachta.

Ní Chinnéide's first book of poetry was published by Cló Iar-Chonnachta in 2005.  deleted  by Salmon Poetry (2019) was her first collection in English. 

Ní Chinnidéide was appointed writer-in-residence at Dublin City University for the 2017-2018 year. Her first English language book of poetry was published in 2019.

Official website is at dairenanichinneide.com

Selected works
 An Trodaí & Dánta Eile/The Warrior & Other Poems, 2006
 Máthair an Fhiaigh/The Raven's Mother, 2008
 An tEachtrannach/Das Fremde/The Stranger, 2008
 Pol na mBabies, 2008
 Bleachtaire na Seirce, 2011
 Cloithear Aistear Anama, Coiscéim, 2013
 Labhraíonn Fungie/Fungie Speaks, 2015
 Fé Gheasa/Spellbound, 2016
  Tairseach, Éabhlóid, 2021
  Cinnlínte, Breaking Verse, 2022 

Full list of published works:

References 

Irish journalists
Irish broadcasters
Irish-language poets
Irish women poets
Living people
21st-century Irish people
People from County Kerry
Year of birth missing (living people)